Searing (or pan searing) is a technique used in grilling, baking, braising, roasting, sautéing, etc., in which the surface of the food (usually meat such as beef, poultry, pork, seafood) is cooked at high temperature until a browned crust forms. Similar techniques, browning and blackening, are typically used to sear all sides of a particular piece of meat, fish, poultry, etc. before finishing it in the oven.

Although often said to "lock in the moisture" or "seal in the juices", in fact, searing results in a greater loss of moisture than cooking to the same internal temperature without searing. Nonetheless, it remains an essential technique in cooking meat for several reasons:

The browning creates desirable flavors through the Maillard reaction.
The appearance of the food is usually improved with a well-browned crust.
The contrast in taste and texture between the crust and the interior makes the food more interesting.

Searing does not cause caramelization, which affects only sugars, or simple carbohydrates; the Maillard reaction involves reactions between amino acids and some sugars.

Typically in grilling, the food will be seared over very high heat and then moved to a lower-temperature area of the grill to finish cooking. In braising, the seared surface flavors and colors the cooking liquid.

Reverse searing 

In reverse searing, the order of cooking is inverted. First the item to be cooked, typically a steak, is cooked at low heat until the center reaches desired temperature; then the outside is cooked with high temperature to achieve the Maillard reaction. This technique is typically recommended for thicker pieces of meat,  or thicker, allowing for consistent internal cooking temperature with only the outer portion becoming seared.

Sealing in the juices
The belief that searing meat "seals in the juices" is widespread and still often repeated. This theory was first put forth by Liebig around 1850. The notion was embraced by contemporary cooks and authors, including Escoffier. It is typically mentioned for larger cuts, especially steaks and chops, of non-poultry meats such as beef, pork, lamb and tuna.

Experiments to test the theory were carried out as early as the 1930s and found that the seared roasts lost the same amount of moisture or more. Generally more liquid is lost, since searing exposes the meat to higher temperatures that destroy more cells, in turn releasing more liquid.

Moisture in liquid and vapor form continues to escape from a seared piece of meat. For this reason, searing is sometimes done at the end of the cooking process to gain the flavor benefits of the Maillard reaction, as well as the benefits of cooking for a greater duration with more moistness.

References

Cooking techniques
Culinary terminology